Joe or Joseph Dunn may refer to:

Sports
Joe Dunn (baseball) (1885–1944), American baseball player
Red Dunn (Joseph Dunn, 1901–1957), American football running back
Jake Dunn (Joseph P. Dunn Jr., 1909–1984), American baseball player
Joe Dunn (footballer) (1925–2005), Scottish football player and manager
Joe Lee Dunn (born 1946), American football coach

Others
Joseph Dunn (entrepreneur) (1746–1827), English priest and entrepreneur
Joseph Dunn (shark victim), survivor of the Jersey Shore shark attacks of 1916
Joe Dunn (California politician) (born 1958), California state senator
Joe Dunn (Illinois politician) (born 1968), Illinois politician

See also
 Joe Dunne (disambiguation)